Calotes vindumbarbatus is a species of agamid lizard. It is found in Myanmar.

References

Calotes
Reptiles of Myanmar
Reptiles described in 2021